George Arnulph Montgomerie, 15th Earl of Eglinton, 3rd Earl of Winton (23 February 1848 – 10 August 1919) was the third and youngest son of Archibald Montgomerie, 13th Earl of Eglinton and his first wife, Theresa Newcomen.

Family
Lord Eglinton married Janet Lucretia Cuninghame on 13 November 1873. They had several children:

 Lady Georgiana Theresa Montgomerie (d. 21 August 1938)
 Lady Edith Mary Montgomerie (d. 8 September 1947)
 Archibald Seton Montgomerie, 16th Earl of Eglinton (23 June 1880 - 22 April 1945)
 William Alexander Montgomerie (29 October 1881 - d. 9 May 1903)
 Captain Francis Cuninghame Montgomerie (b. 25 January 1887 - 16 March 1950)

Lord Eglinton died on 10 August 1919, aged 71.

External links

15
1848 births
1919 deaths
Place of birth missing
Place of death missing
Clan Montgomery
Members of the British House of Lords